The Sisterhood of the Traveling Pants is a series of young-adult novels by Ann Brashares.

The Sisterhood of the Traveling Pants may also refer to:

 The Sisterhood of the Traveling Pants (novel), the first book in the series
 The Sisterhood of the Traveling Pants (film series)
 The Sisterhood of the Traveling Pants (film), a 2005 film adaptation, followed by a sequel
 The Sisterhood of the Traveling Pants 2, the 2008 sequel to the 2005 film
 It can also refer to the four central characters of the Traveling Pants series: Lena Kaligaris, Bridget Vreeland, Tibby Rollins, and Carmen Lowell.